Melville is a locality in the City of Maitland in the Hunter Region of New South Wales, Australia.

The Hunter River is located along the southern and western boundary rising to the Rosebrook Ridge at  located in the North.

The traditional owners and custodians of the Maitland area are the Wonnarua people.

References